Gulustan fortress is an ancient fortress in Goranboy region of Azerbaijan. The fortress is located at the foothills of Murovdag, bordering Agdere and Goranboy regions. It is encircled by precipice from eastern, western and southwestern sides, forest from the north side, and slope from the south-eastside. The fortress is situated on the coast of Incechay, at a height of 1700 m above sea level and 200–250 m above the nearby territory. The way to the fortress is from south-east. The length of the fortress is 200–250 m in the east–west direction and 20–25 m in the north–south direction. The width of the wall is 0.8–0.9 m in the north and west, and in the south wall it is 1.5 m. It is reported that there is also a secret road leading to the river.

The name of the fortress, "Gulustan" is a Persian word, meaning "flower garden". Certain towers of it have been preserved. According to researchers the date of construction of the tower dates back to the period of Caucasian Albania. It is built of local stones. The fortress was a strong defensive tower. It was the center of the Gulustan Kingdom which existed in the 18th–19th centuries. Also, the significant historic Treaty of Gulistan was signed in this fortress.

History 
The fortress was supposedly built in the 9th century . Orientalist and archaeologist Yevgeny Pakhomov assumed that the city of Yazidiya was located in the area of ​​the ruins of this fortress, the name of which as the capital of Shirvan is mentioned in “Tarikh al-Bab” until 1072.  From the 11th to the 16th century it was the residence and defensive fortress of the Shirvanshahs . Due to severe destruction, from the entire closed structure of the Gulustan fortress, scattered in the mountain terrain, individual towers and wall sections remain. The most monumental constellations are located at the beginning of the path leading up to the castle, next to the ruined entrance gate. To the west of them, the remains of another semicircular constellation rise. This rectangular constellation is on the western slope of the mountain. The lower terrace of the mountain facing the valley also has rock walls. All these wall and tower remains were once inside the strong fortress walls that surrounded the mountain like a belt. In the recent past, more construction of the Gulustan fortress was visible and created a more complete picture of its architecture. After the Mongol invasion (around 1239), significant buildings are not found in Shirvan until the end of the 13th century, which indicates that the country was devastated by military operations. However, from the beginning of the 14th century, large defense buildings and temples began to be built all over the country.

Despite the fact that Shamakhi Castle was surrounded by double castle walls in the Middle Ages and Gulustan Castle became a reliable defensive castle in times of danger, the emergence and use of firearms, especially cannons, in the 15th and especially the 16th and 17th centuries caused Shirvan shahs to return to the problem of defense. They could no longer use either the Shamakhi fortress or the Gulistan fortress to defend the state and the capital city through a more convenient fortress. This time, Bugurt Castle was supposed to act as a more magnificent and impregnable castle. That is why, after the 16th century, Bugurt Castle was mentioned more often in historical sources. The fortress of Gulistan was mentioned in their works by Khagani Shirvani, Arif Ardebili and others. So, in the poems of Khagani Shirvani, dedicated to Shirvanshah Akhsitan in connection with the Novruz holiday, there are the following lines:

"Gale gulistane shah gulleye Bugbeis dan,

Hisne Shemakhiash haram, kebe saraye taze bin."

(Know that the Shah's fortress Gulistan is like the peak of Bugbeis. Its

Shemakha fortress is a harem, and Gulistan is a new kaba-shed.)

Azerbaijani archaeologist Huseyn Jiddi believes that Khagani calls the fortress "a new kaba-shed" in connection with the reconstruction of the fortress. This information is also confirmed by written sources, according to which in the XII century the sister of the Shirvanshah Manuchehr III  - Shahbany carried out repairs in the fortress. Information about the fortress, its walls and general appearance is available in the work of the teacher of the son of the Shirvanshah Kavus Arif Ardebili "Farhad-name", which was written in the style of the poem " Khosrov and Shirin " by Nizami Ganjavi.

After the ruler of the Safavid state, Shah Ismail, took Baku in 1501, his troops besieged the Gulistan fortress, but they did not succeed in taking it. The attempt to take the fortresses of Kale-i Bugurt and Surkhab was also unsuccessful . Thus, due to stubborn resistance, Ismail was forced to lift the siege of Gulistan. . In the spring of 1538, the 20,000-strong Safavid army again moved to Shirvan. The country was devastated. The Qizilbash surrounded the Gulistan fortress  and after a long siege took it . The emirs of Shirvan were executed, and the last Shirvanshah Shahrukh  was taken toTabriz, where he was killed .

In 1547, Shah Tahmasp 's brother Beylerbey Shirvan Elkas Mirza raised a rebellion, which was suppressed, and Elkas Mirza himself fled. In the Gulistan fortress, the adherents of Elkas still resisted the Shah's troops. The resistance here was led by Mehtar Devlet Yar. For negotiations, the shah sent an ambassador to the fortress, who was executed by the defenders of the citadel. For three months the Qizilbash failed to capture the fortress. Hasan-bek Rumlu notes that the fortress was taken with the help of women embittered at Devlet Yar, who threw tent ropes to the shamlu kurchis, who managed to climb the fortress walls along them. By order of the Shah, the fortress was destroyed. With the advent and spread of firearms, the Gulistan fortress eventually lost its defensive significance.

See also
Architecture of Azerbaijan

References

Monuments and memorials in Azerbaijan
Tourist attractions in Azerbaijan